Ingushes in Jordan — is an Ingush diaspora of about twenty-five thousand people who live in many cities and villages of Jordan.

History

During the Caucasian War 

After the Caucasian War in 1865, part of the Ingush migrated (Muhajirism) to the Ottoman Empire. In total, 1454 families moved out of Ingushetia, in particular from two communities (Karabulak and Nazranovsky sections of the Ingush district) (including Karabulaks - 1366 families and Nazranians - 88 families) (according to other sources - up to 1500 families of Karabulaks and 100 families Nazranites). The descendants of those settlers form the Ingush diasporas in Turkey, Jordan and Syria. In these countries, many Ingush were recorded under the ethnonym Circassians.

Modern time 
The Russian delegation accompanying the first person of the state included the leaders of the North Caucasian republics.
For the President of Ingushetia, Murat Zyazikov, this is not the first visit to Amman, the Jordanian capital. Not only as politicians, but also as friends. Between the Hashemite Kingdom and Ingushetia today a bridge of cooperation in the field of education, culture and tourism is being built. Economic, cultural and trade projects are planned for the coming years. And this gives new opportunities for opening Ingushetia to the world, for demonstrating its social achievements.

See also 
Ingush diaspora
Ingushes in Europe
Ingushes in Turkey
Ingushes in Syria

References

Bibliography 

(according to other sources - up to 1500 families of Karabulaks and 100 families Nazranites.

Jordan
Ethnic groups in Jordan